The 2013 Malaysia FA Cup Final was a football match which was played on 29 June 2013, to determine the champion of the 2013 Malaysia FA Cup. It was the final of the 24th edition of the Malaysia FA Cup, competition organised by the Football Association of Malaysia.

The final was played between Kelantan and Johor Darul Takzim. Kelantan won 1–0 to win their second Malaysia FA Cup title for the second year in row.

Venue
The final was held at the National Stadium, Bukit Jalil in Kuala Lumpur.

Road to final

Match details

References

External links
FAM Official website

Final
2013 in Malaysian football